Skalborg railway station is a railway station serving the district of Skalborg in the southern part of the city of Aalborg, Denmark.

The station is located on the Randers–Aalborg railway line from Randers to Aalborg and forms part of the Aalborg Commuter Rail service. The station opened in 1899–1900, closed in 1972, and reopened in 2003. The train services are currently operated by the railway companies DSB and Nordjyske Jernbaner.

History 
The original station opened in 1899–1900. The station was opened to allow for trains travelling in opposite directions on the then single track railway line to pass each other by means of a passing loop. The passing loop was made longer with the opening of the Aars-Nibe-Svendstrup railway line in 1899, which used the tracks of the Randers–Aalborg line between Svenstrup station and Aalborg station from 1902. The Aars-Nibe-Svendstrup railway line was extended to Hvalpsund in 1910. The line northwards to Aalborg was doubled on 17 September 1940 and the line southwards to Svendstrup was doubled on 10 December 1940.

The Aalborg–Hvalpsund railway line was closed in 1969. The station itself closed to passengers in 1972 during a series of station closures in the 1970s. However, the station reopened in 2003 as a part of the new Aalborg Commuter Rail service. In 2017, operation of the commuter rail services to Aalborg and Skørping were transferred from DSB to the local railway company Nordjyske Jernbaner.

Operations 
The train services are operated by the railway companies DSB and Nordjyske Jernbaner. The station offers direct InterCity services to Copenhagen and Aalborg, operated by DSB, and commuter train services to Skørping and Aalborg, operated by Nordjyske Jernbaner.

See also 
 List of railway stations in Denmark

References

Bibliography

External links

 Banedanmark – government agency responsible for maintenance and traffic control of most of the Danish railway network
 DSB – largest Danish train operating company
 Nordjyske Jernbaner – Danish railway company operating in North Jutland Region
 Danske Jernbaner – website with information on railway history in Denmark
 Nordjyllands Jernbaner – website with information on railway history in North Jutland

Railway stations in Aalborg
Railway stations opened in 2003
Railway stations closed in 1972
Railway stations in Denmark opened in the 21st century